The 2011 ITF Men's Circuit is the 2011 edition of the third tier tour for men's professional tennis. It is organised by the International Tennis Federation and is a tier below the ATP Challenger Tour. During the months of January 2011 and March 2011 over 80 tournaments were played with the majority being played in the month of January.

Key

January

February

March

See also
2011 ITF Men's Circuit
2011 ITF Men's Circuit (April–June)
2011 ITF Men's Circuit (July–September)
2011 ITF Men's Circuit (October–December)
2011 ATP World Tour
2011 ATP Challenger Tour

References

 01-03